Ross Smith (born 3 February 1965) is the defensive coach at the Richmond Football Club in the Australian Football League (AFL). He is a former Australian rules footballer who played 224 games for AFL club North Melbourne between 1984 and 1996, mainly on the half back line. 

In 1997, Smith captain-coached Ainslie to the Australian Capital Territory Football League premiership. He then served as the inaugural captain-coach of the Bendigo Diggers in the Victorian Football League in 1998. Smith joined Richmond as an assistant coach in September 2011, signing a three-year deal. He was previously an assistant coach at Hawthorn for seven years.

References

External links

1965 births
Living people
Australian rules footballers from Victoria (Australia)
North Melbourne Football Club players
Victorian State of Origin players
Ainslie Football Club players
Ainslie Football Club coaches
Bendigo Football Club players
Jacana Football Club players
Australia international rules football team players